Irving Allen Lee (November 21, 1948 – September 5, 1992) was an American actor known for playing Detective Calvin Stoner on The Edge of Night from 1977-1984 and Dr. Evan Cooper on Ryan's Hope from 1986-1988. He also appeared in "Ain't Misbehavin" in the late 1970s.  He died from an AIDS related illness in 1992, aged 43.

Filmography
The Edge of Night (1979-1984) (Calvin Stoner)
Breaking Up (1985 film) (Dion) (uncredited)
Ryan's Hope (1986–89) (Dr. Evan Cooper)

References

External links

American male soap opera actors
African-American male actors
1948 births
1992 deaths
AIDS-related deaths in New York (state)
American male television actors
20th-century American male actors
20th-century African-American people